Hornsby Ku-ring-gai Hospital is a hospital in Sydney, Australia, located on Palmerston Road in Hornsby. As a provider of care since 1933, the Hornsby Ku-ring-gai Hospital is a major metropolitan hospital, and is a teaching hospital of the University of Sydney. It provides hospital care for around 300,000 people living in the Hornsby Ku-ring-gai area. The Hornsby Ku-ring-gai Health Service also incorporates six Community Health Centres and ten Early Childhood Centres.

The hospital is under the control of the Northern Sydney Local Health District having previously been a part of the Northern Sydney Central Coast Area Health Service.

While much of the hospital is of a ramshackle design, the main building is a two-storey circular design (named the Lumby Building for its benefactor), which forms the emblem of the hospital.

Development
The Emergency, Paediatrics and Maternity building was opened in late 2006. It is called the HOPE Building (Hospital's Obstetrics, Paediatrics, & Emergency) and now also houses an emergency Mental Health Unit the PECC.

In late 2013 the Mental Health Centre building was opened.

On 5 September 2015, the STAR Building (Surgical, Theatres, Anesthetic, Recovery) was officially opened by NSW Minister for Health Jillian Skinner.

The hospital is currently undergoing major building works. A new Medical Assessment Unit (MAU) has been created from the renovated remains of the old Emergency Department. The Social Work department now has new offices opposite the Fresh Plus Cafe. Major construction of new Mental Health and Drug, Alcohol & Gambling Services buildings including a Mental Health ICU have significantly improved care provision in the area. The old maternity building along with much of the campus is due to be redeveloped.

In popular culture
Hornsby Ku-ring-gai Hospital was featured in episodes of the TV series Sons and Daughters in 1984 when character Gordon Hamilton  (portrayed by Brian Blain) was treated for a heart attack there.

It was also used frequently to film episodes of the Australian medical drama series All Saints where the historic lions outside the, soon to be demolished, "old" maternity building were featured.

Supplementary facilities 
Many houses in the surrounding streets, especially in Palmerston Road, have been converted to medical practices, such as ophthalmology, ear nose and throat, and other specialists.  There is also a child-care establishment, and café.

See also
 List of hospitals in Australia

References

Citations

Sources 

 SMH Article 4 Nov 2011
 Australian Healthcare & Hospitals Association article
 Hills News Sept 7, 2011
 Member for Hornsby 5 Dec 2011

External links 
 Hornsby Ku-ring-gai Hospital – actual official link (by zPiotrW)

Hospital buildings completed in 1933
Hospitals in Sydney
Teaching hospitals in Australia
Hospitals established in 1933
1933 establishments in Australia